René Guissart may refer to:

 René Guissart (director), French cinematographer and film director
 René Guissart (rower), French rower at the 1956 Olympics